Let Yourself Go is Kristin Chenoweth's debut solo album, released in 2001. The backing orchestra is Robert Fisher and the Coffee Club Orchestra. The fifth track, "Hangin' Around with You", features actor Jason Alexander.

Track listing
 "Let Yourself Go" from the 1936 film Follow the Fleet
 "If You Hadn't but You Did" from the 1951 musical revue Two on the Aisle
 "How Long Has This Been Going On?" from the 1928 musical Rosalie
 "My Funny Valentine" from the 1937 musical Babes in Arms
 "Hangin' Around with You" from the 1930 musical Strike Up the Band
 "The Girl in 14G"
 "I'll Tell the Man in the Street" from the 1938 musical I Married an Angel
 "I'm a Stranger Here Myself" from the 1943 musical One Touch of Venus
 "Nobody Else but Me" from the 1946 Broadway revival of the musical Show Boat
 "Nobody's Heart Belongs to Me" from the musical By Jupiter / "Why Can't I?" from the 1929 musical Spring Is Here
 "Should I Be Sweet?" from the 1933 musical Take a Chance
 "Just an Ordinary Guy"
 "Goin' to the Dance with You"
 "On a Turquoise Cloud"
 "You'll Never Know" from the 1943 film Hello, Frisco, Hello
 "Daddy"

References

2001 debut albums
Kristin Chenoweth albums